Lasse Nielsen (born 8 January 1988) is a Danish professional footballer who plays a centre back for Allsvenskan side Malmö FF. He formerly played for AaB, NEC, and Gent. He has won one cap for the Denmark national team.

Career statistics

Club

Honours
AaB
Danish Superliga: 2013–14
Danish Cup: 2013–14

Gent
Belgian Pro League: 2014–15
Belgian Super Cup: 2015

Malmö FF
Allsvenskan: 2017, 2020, 2021
Svenska Cupen: 2021–22

References

External links
KAA Gent profile
National team profile
Career statistics at Danmarks Radio
 Voetbal International profile 
 

1988 births
Living people
Danish men's footballers
Denmark under-21 international footballers
Denmark youth international footballers
Danish expatriate men's footballers
AaB Fodbold players
NEC Nijmegen players
K.A.A. Gent players
Malmö FF players
Danish Superliga players
Eredivisie players
Belgian Pro League players
Allsvenskan players
Expatriate footballers in the Netherlands
Expatriate footballers in Belgium
Expatriate footballers in Sweden
Association football defenders
Sportspeople from Aalborg